Kristen Peterson is an American sports shooter. She competed in the 1988 Summer Olympics in Seoul and the 1992 Summer Olympics in Barcelona. She was also a member of Team USA in the 1990 ISSF World Shooting Championships, which won the gold medal in the 10 meter air rifle event, the silver medal in the 50 meter rifle three positions event, and the bronze medal in the 50 meter rifle prone event. Peterson attended the University of South Florida.

References 

University of South Florida alumni
Peterson, Kristen
Olympic shooters of the United States
Living people
Year of birth missing (living people)